Temporary maintenance holdings